"Babbacombe" Lee is a 1971 album by British folk rock group Fairport Convention, which tells the life story of John Babbacombe Lee, a   Victorian-era alleged murderer who was condemned to death but was reprieved after the gallows failed on three occasions to work properly. After the commercial and chart success of its predecessor, Angel Delight, the album sold disappointingly, though it was critically acclaimed, and is regarded by the authors of The Electric Muse (1975) as the first "folk rock opera". It was the band's seventh album since their debut in 1968.

Concept 
The album follows John "Babbacombe" Lee's life story. The events of his life are described in song, from his boyhood through his conviction for murder, sentence of death, and the failure to carry out the execution. The songs describe his boyhood poverty, his time in the Royal Navy, and his being invalided out. The album then describes how Lee went to work in the service of a Miss Keyes. While Lee was in her service, she was murdered, and he was accused, tried and convicted of the crime, and sentenced to death; however, when authorities attempted to hang him, the gallows failed three times, resulting in his release. These events are all told in song, and all but one of those songs are originals.

Dave Swarbrick has explained that he conceived the album after discovering a file of old newspaper clippings in a junk shop; this file contained John Lee's own copies of the newspaper articles and was bound by him, signed and dated 30 January 1908.

Because of its relatively complete narrative structure, "Babbacombe" Lee is regarded by the authors of The Electric Muse (1975) as a rock opera, and because of the band's musical style, in particular the first folk rock opera.

Track listing 
Songs written by Fairport Convention

The original album listed tracks episodically rather than as discrete tracks, reflecting the structure of the narrative.

Each of the five sections is composed of a number of songs and fragments of songs that were not listed separately on the original album.

2004 Compact Disc listing 
The later release of the album abandoned the original five-part division and lists the songs as separate tracks complete with songwriting credits, as follows:

 "The Verdict" (read by Philip Sterling-Wall)  – 0:28
 "Little Did I Think" (Dave Swarbrick) – 2:19
 "I Was Sixteen (Part 1)" (Simon Nicol, Dave Pegg) – 1:29
 "John My Son" (Nicol, Pegg) – 0:44
 "I Was Sixteen (Part 2)" (Nicol, Pegg) – 1:17
 "St Ninian's Isle" (Ronald Cooper) / Trumpet Hornpipe (Traditional; arranged by Swarbrick) – 1:14
 "Sailor's Alphabet" (Traditional; arranged by A.L. Lloyd) – 5:50
 "John Lee" (Swarbrick) – 3:04
 "Newspaper Reading (read by A.L. Lloyd) – 0:46
 "Breakfast in Mayfair" (Nicol) – 3:09
 "Trial Song" (Swarbrick, Pegg) – 3:55
 "Cell Song" (Swarbrick) – 3:35
 "The Time Is Near" (Pegg) – 2:31
 "Dream Song" (Swarbrick, Pegg) – 5:24
 "Wake Up John (Hanging Song)" (Swarbrick, Pegg) – 5:25

Two additional bonus tracks appear on some post-2004 CD releases:
<li>"Farewell to a Poor Man's Son" (Swarbrick)  – 4:55
<li>"Breakfast In Mayfair" (Nicol) 3:59

These tracks were recorded in late 1974 for the BBC 2 documentary about John Lee narrated by Melvyn Bragg. The programme was broadcast in the BBC 2 2nd House series as "The Man They Couldn't Hang – John Lee" on 1 February 1975. Personnel: Dave Swarbrick, Dave Pegg, Dave Mattacks, Jerry Donahue, Simon Nicol (although he was not in the band at this time, Nicol made a brief return for this one-off project), with, for one song, the newly returned Sandy Denny.

2011 "Babbacombe" Lee Live Again 
In 2011, to celebrate the 40th anniversary of the original album, Fairport performed "Babbacombe" Lee in its entirety on both their Winter Tour and at the Cropredy Festival in August. The performance was released as a CD & digital download in 2012. Personnel: Simon Nicol, Dave Pegg, Ric Sanders, Chris Leslie, Gerry Conway.

Personnel 
Fairport Convention
 Simon Nicol – vocals, guitar, dulcimer (12)
 Dave Mattacks – drums, electric piano (12), harmonium (6,7)
 Dave Swarbrick – vocals, fiddle, mandolin
 Dave Pegg – vocals, bass, mandolin

on 16 and 17:
 Jerry Donahue – lead guitar
 Sandy Denny – vocals on "Breakfast in Mayfair"

References 

1971 albums
Fairport Convention albums
Albums produced by John Wood (record producer)
Island Records albums
Albums produced by Simon Nicol
2012 live albums
Fairport Convention live albums
Rock operas
John Babbacombe Lee